Sugar Street is a street in Causeway Bay, Hong Kong.

The street is less than 100 metres long. It runs one-way (west to east) in one lane of traffic.

Etymology
According to local folklore the street received its name after the Hong Kong Mint, based here from 1866 to 1868 failed because although silver was poured into the coin making machinery, "sparkling white sugar grains emerged."

See also
 List of streets and roads in Hong Kong

References

Further reading
 

Causeway Bay
Roads on Hong Kong Island